This comparison only covers software licenses which have a linked Wikipedia article for details and which are approved by at least one of the following expert groups: the Free Software Foundation, the Open Source Initiative, the Debian Project and the Fedora Project. For a list of licenses not specifically intended for software, see List of free-content licences.

FOSS licenses
FOSS stands for "Free and Open Source Software". There is no one universally agreed-upon definition of FOSS software and various groups maintain approved lists of licenses. The Open Source Initiative (OSI) is one such organization keeping a list of open-source licenses. The Free Software Foundation (FSF) maintains a list of what it considers free. FSF's free software and OSI's open-source licenses together are called FOSS licenses. There are licenses accepted by the OSI which are not free as per the Free Software Definition. The Open Source Definition allows for further restrictions like price, type of contribution and origin of the contribution, e.g. the case of the NASA Open Source Agreement, which requires the code to be "original" work. The OSI does not endorse FSF license analysis (interpretation) as per their disclaimer.

The FSF's Free Software Definition focuses on the user's unrestricted rights to use a program, to study and modify it, to copy it, and redistribute it for any purpose, which are considered by the FSF the four essential freedoms. The OSI's open-source criteria focuses on the availability of the source code and the advantages of an unrestricted and community driven development model. Yet, many FOSS licenses, like the Apache License, and all Free Software licenses allow commercial use of FOSS components.

General comparison

For a simpler comparison across the most common licenses see free-software license comparison.

The following table compares various features of each license and is a general guide to the terms and conditions of each license, based on seven subjects or categories. Recent tools like the European Commissions' Joinup Licensing Assistant, makes possible the licenses selection and comparison based on more than 40 subjects or categories, with access to their SPDX identifier and full text. The table below lists the permissions and limitations regarding the following subjects:
 Linking - linking of the licensed code with code licensed under a different license (e.g. when the code is provided as a library)
 Distribution - distribution of the code to third parties
 Modification - modification of the code by a licensee
 Patent grant - protection of licensees from patent claims made by code contributors regarding their contribution, and protection of contributors from patent claims made by licensees
 Private use - whether modification to the code must be shared with the community or may be used privately (e.g. internal use by a corporation)
 Sublicensing - whether modified code may be licensed under a different license (for example a copyright) or must retain the same license under which it was provided
 TM grant - use of trademarks associated with the licensed code or its contributors by a licensee

In this table, "permissive" means the software has minimal restrictions on how it can be used, modified, and redistributed, usually including a warranty disclaimer. "Copyleft" means the software requires that its source code be made publicly available and that all provisions in the license be preserved in derivative works.

Other licenses that don't have information:

Approvals
This table lists for each license what organizations from the FOSS community have approved itbe it as a "free software" or as an "open source" license, how those organizations categorize it, and the license compatibility between them for a combined or mixed derivative work. Organizations usually approve specific versions of software licenses. For instance, a FSF approval means that the Free Software Foundation (FSF) considers a license to be free-software license. The FSF recommends at least "Compatible with GPL" and preferably copyleft. The OSI recommends a mix of permissive and copyleft licenses, the Apache License 2.0, 2- & 3-clause BSD license, GPL, LGPL, MIT license, MPL 2.0, CDDL and EPL.

See also

 Free software
 Free-software license
 Open-source license
 Open-source software
 Source-available software

References

Debian

Free Software Foundation
Free software lists and comparisons
Licenses
Companies' terms of service